Rene Caovilla, born in 1938 along the Riviera del Brenta in Fiesso D’Artico (VE), Italy, is an Italian fashion designer.

Biography 

Edoardo Caovilla, the father of Rene Fernando, was a student of Luigi Voltan, who had been the first to make shoes in Riviera del Brenta. Edoardo Caovilla favored high-end fashions marrying craftsmanship with couture. Edoardo’s wife would embroider shoes by hand in a small room with four other people. The room in which they worked has been preserved in the Caovilla factory.

In 1950, Rene Caovilla went to Paris and London to study design. He returned home and began working with his father. In the early 1960s he took over the family business from his father.  He met his wife, Paola, whose family was also in the footwear business at a shoe fair. Paola became responsible for public relations and the Caovilla handbag line. His concentration was on the high-end of the market with opulent evening shoes. His work is known for elegant detailing and high quality.

Beginning in the 1970s, he worked with Valentino Garavani. In the 1980s, he began to collaborate with Christian Dior and Chanel.
Working alongside Karl Lagerfeld in 2000, Caovilla decided to create jeweled shoes. On 10 September 2007, Harrods hired a live Egyptian cobra to protect the shoe counter, guarding a pair of haute couture ruby, sapphire and diamond encrusted sandals launched by Rene Caovilla.

Celebraties, that have been seen wearing Rene Caovilla shoes are Jennifer Aniston, Tyra Banks, and Heidi Klum, Kristen Stewart, Nikki Reed, Kim Kardashian, and Rihanna.

References

Italian fashion designers
Living people
Year of birth missing (living people)